The 1975-76 2nd Bundesliga season was the third season of the 2nd Bundesliga, the second level of ice hockey in Germany. Ten teams participated in the league, and Augsburger EV won the championship, and was promoted to the Ice hockey Bundesliga as a result. TSV Straubing was relegated to the Oberliga.

Regular season

References

External links
Season on hockeyarchives.info

2nd Bundesliga (ice hockey) seasons
2